Scanner Cop is a 1994 Canadian science fiction action horror film. It is the fourth film in the Scanners series and the first film in the Scanner Cop series. It was written, produced, and directed by Pierre David.  Daniel Quinn stars as the title character, a police officer with psychic powers.

Plot

A scanner goes crazy and is shot by officer Pete Harrigan (Richard Grove). Harrigan discovers the scanner had a child and adopts him. 15 years later Harrigan is now the leader of the LAPD and the child, Sam Staziak (Daniel Quinn), is a rookie cop with the same Los Angeles Police Department.

Staziak is also a 'Scanner' (a person born with telepathic and telekinetic abilities), although he keeps the powers hidden. 
Dr. Karl Glock (Richard Lynch) is a psychiatrist who is using a cult he leads to brainwash individuals to kill police.

As the string of murders begins to decimate the police department, Sam faces sensory overload and possible insanity as he reluctantly uses his powers to hunt the man responsible for the killings.

Sam scans the memories of a coroner (Gary Hudson) who committed suicide, providing clues to find Glock. Police psychiatrist Dr Arden discovers puncture marks. indicating those who have been killing officers were drugged. A scan by Sam of a wife who killed her police officer husband shows the drug makes the victim see a giant version of whatever phobia they have.

Glock traps Sam, but Sam escapes. Sam attempts to scan Glock but is blocked by a metal plate in Glock's head. Glock attempts to pose as Harrigan's surgeon, but Sam scans the plate out of Glock's head killing him.

Production

Directed by Pierre David, who is better known as the producer of various psycho-thrillers including the original Scanners.

Written by George Sanders and John Bryant Hedberg based on a story by Pierre David.

The 25th Anniversary DVD release contains a thorough 30 minute documentary on the making of the movie.

Release
The film was released on VHS and LaserDisc by Republic Pictures. A DVD has been released in Canada, along with the sequel Scanners: The Showdown (also known as Scanner Cop 2).

The film along with Scanners: The Showdown was released on 4K Ultra HD and Blu-ray from Vinegar Syndrome in a double feature set on May 28, 2021.

Reception 
Empire rated it 2/5 stars and described it as a "moderately enjoyable horror movie, that suffers for its cast and script".  TV Guide rated it 2/4 stars and wrote that the film "works as a solid exploitation item", though it criticized the police procedural aspects.   Glenn Kenny of Entertainment Weekly, in an article critiquing recent direct-to-video releases, rated it D+ and called the plot an excuse for "gruesome special effects".

Writing for Bloody Disgusting, Daniel Baldwin praised the film for taking the Scanners series in a new direction, describing it as "a tightly-written and paced cop thriller". Moira gave the film two stars, found it not a dire as the other films in the franchise, and it was competently made but otherwise found it pedestrian.

TV Guide found that the movie depends a bit too much on the police procedural portion of the plot, but overall the movie is intriguing and works as a solid exploitation movie. It did note that Glock should have been given more screen time

Sequel

Scanner Cop II Volkin's Revenge, also known as  Scanners: The Showdown, was released in 1995.

References

External links
 

1994 films
1994 direct-to-video films
1994 horror films
1990s action films
1990s science fiction horror films
Canadian direct-to-video films
Canadian science fiction horror films
English-language Canadian films
Canadian action horror films
Direct-to-video sequel films
Scanners (film series)
Films about telekinesis
Films scored by Louis Febre
1990s English-language films
1990s Canadian films